The Department of the Litoral, also known as the Atacama Department and commonly known as the Bolivian coast, was the description of the extent of the Pacific coast of the Atacama Desert included in the territory of Bolivia from its inception in 1825 until 1879, when it was lost to Chile.

Background
When Bolivia emerged in 1825 as an independent state, these territories were part of the Bolivian Potosí Department. During the government of Andrés de Santa Cruz, the territories were established as the Department of the Litoral.

The main towns on the Pacific coast, from north to south, were Tocopilla, Cobija, Mejillones and Antofagasta.

The port of Paposo was taken from the colony as the capital of the coast Atacameño. After it consolidated its independence, Chile executed various acts of sovereignty on the northern desert coast. It established its territory throughout the coast to the mouth of the River Loa, forming a border with Peru. Chile would have expanded more, but this was prevented by Bolivia establishing the city of Cobija.

Administrative divisions
In 1875 the capital of the department was moved from La Mar (today Cobija) to Antofagasta. When the War of the Pacific broke out in 1879, the divisions of the department were as follows:

Treaties

The treaty of 1866 established the border between the two States on the parallel 24°, creating an area of common interests between 23 and 25 degrees south latitude.

The treaty of 1874, which established the final boundary between the two nations the parallel 24°, provided that for a period of 25 years, new taxes shall not be imposed on the Chilean people and companies based in the area.

Chile was willing to move down the coast from the desert to allow Bolivia a sovereign outlet to the ocean, under the conditions seen before. This eliminated the area of common interest from the treaty of 1866.

Bolivia and Peru, bound by a secret treaty of defensive alliance since 1873 (one year before the border treaty with Chile), were defeated by Chile in the War of the Pacific which lasted until 1884, costing Bolivia its coast and Peru its department of Tarapacá. Though the coast was a valuable source of saltpeter, it was not the cause.

Claim
Since then, Bolivia retains the policy of a territorial claim of a sovereign outlet to the Pacific Ocean. As part of this policy, the national coat of arms shows 10 stars: the 9 current departments and the tenth representing the former Litoral Department.

The internal communications of the armed forces carried the slogan in the footnotes: "The sea is ours by right. To recover it is a duty." (in Spanish, "El mar es nuestro por derecho, recuperarlo es un deber").

Día del Mar is celebrated annually in Bolivia. During the week long event, Bolivia reasserts their claim to their lost territory; some of the celebrations contain Chilenophobic statements.

See also

 War of the Pacific
 Battle of Río Grande
 Puna de Atacama dispute
 Landlocked country
 Anti-Chilean sentiment

Notes

References

Departments of Bolivia
History of Antofagasta Region
Former departments
Bolivian irredentism
Anti-Chilean sentiment
Annexation
Bolivia–Chile border